Nuruddin ibn Ali ar-Raniri (also transliterated Nur ud-Din ar-Raniri / Randeri, died 1658) was an Islamic mystic and scholar from Rander in Surat province of Gujarat, in India, who worked for several years in the court of the sultan of Aceh in what is now Indonesia. He was the most prolific of the authors of the Acehnese court, and helped contribute to its international reputation as a center of scholarship. His work was considered the oldest Muslim scholarship of South east Asia.

Shaikh Randeri (Ar-Raniri) (Shaikh Nur ad-Deen Muhammad b. Ali b. Hasanji al-Hamid as-Shafi'i al-Ashari al-'Aydarusi ar-Randeri) was born into a Gujarati Muslim family  of Hadhrami lineage, that was descended from Quraysh Arabian nobility. He arrived in Aceh in 1637 and enjoyed the patronage of Iskandar Thani (reigned 1636-1641) in quality of jurist consult (Arabic: mufti) and later of the highest-ranking religious office of Shaykh al-Islām. He denounced his predecessors at the Acehnese court, Hamzah Pansuri and Syamsuddin of Pasai, for what he saw as their heresy in violation of the Islamic belief that God was unchanged by his creation. He ordered their books to be burned, while he wrote numerous works setting what he insisted were orthodox religious standards.

His most notable work was the Bustan as-Salatin ("The Garden of Kings"), begun in 1638 and written in Malay based on Arabic sources. It is a seven-volume encyclopedic work, covering the history of the world from the creation through the period of prophets of Islam and the Muslim kings of the Middle East and the Malay area, as well as several sciences.

Ar-Raniri's works were translated into other Indonesian languages, and had considerable influence in Malay literature. He lost favour with the court of Iskandar Thani's successor, his widow Taj ul-Alam, and left Aceh in 1644, and died in India in 1658.

See also
 Hamzah Fansuri
 Wahdat-ul-Wujud
 Aristotelian metaphysics
 Heraclitus
 Parmenides

References

Sources
 Muhammad Naquib al-Attas. Raniri and the Wujudiyyah of 17th century Aceh. Singapore: Monographs of the Malaysian Branch of the Royal Asiatic Society, no. 3, 1966.
 G.W.J. Drewes. "Nur al-Din al-Raniri's charge of heresy against Hamzah and Shamsuddin from an international point of view." pp. 54–9 in C.D. Grijns and S.O. Robson (eds.). Cultural contact and textual interpretation: Papers from the fourth European colloquium on Malay and Indonesian studies, held in Leiden in 1983. Verhandelingen van het Koninklijk Instituut voor Taal-, Land- en Volkenkunde, vol. 115. Dordrecht and Cinnaminson: Foris Publications, 1986.
 Takeshi Ito. "Why did Nuruddin ar-Raniri leave Aceh in 1054 A.H.?" Bijdragen tot de Taal-, Land- en Volkenkunde, vol. 134, no. 4 (1978), pp. 489–491.

Further reading 
 M.C. Ricklefs. A History of Modern Indonesia Since c. 1300, 2nd ed. Stanford: Stanford University Press, 1994, p. 51.
 Peter G. Riddell Islam and the Malay-Indonesian World: Transmission and Responses published by C. Hurst & Co. Publishers, 2001, 

1658 deaths
Indian expatriates in Indonesia
Gujarati people
17th-century Indian Muslims
Indian people of Yemeni descent
Indonesian people of Indian descent
17th-century Muslim scholars of Islam
Year of birth missing
Hadhrami people
People from Surat